Taylor Davis Motter (born September 18, 1989) is an American professional baseball utility player in the St. Louis Cardinals organization. He has previously played in Major League Baseball (MLB) for the Tampa Bay Rays, Seattle Mariners, Minnesota Twins, Colorado Rockies, Boston Red Sox, and Cincinnati Reds. He has also played in the KBO League for the Kiwoom Heroes.

Amateur career
Motter graduated from Palm Beach Gardens Community High School in Palm Beach Gardens, Florida and played college baseball at Coastal Carolina University in Conway, South Carolina. In three seasons with the Chanticleers (2009–2011), he appeared in 187 games (185 starts) and had a .303 batting average with 18 home runs and 110 runs batted in (RBIs) with a .482 slugging percentage. He helped lead Coastal Carolina to three consecutive Big South Conference baseball championships, three NCAA Regional appearances, and one NCAA Super Regional appearance (2010). While only hitting .256 with no home runs and three RBIs in 13 Big South tournament games, Motter, in 13 NCAA Regional/Super Regional games, hit .333 with three home runs and nine RBIs while compiling a .622 slugging percentage.

In 2010, Motter played collegiate summer baseball with the Harwich Mariners of the Cape Cod Baseball League. He was drafted by the Tampa Bay Rays in the 17th round of the 2011 MLB draft.

Professional career

Tampa Bay Rays
In 2011, Motter played in Minor League Baseball with the Princeton Rays and Bowling Green Hot Rods. He spent 2012 with Bowling Green, 2013 with the Gulf Coast Rays and Charlotte Stone Crabs, 2014 with the Montgomery Biscuits and 2015 in Triple-A with the Durham Bulls. In 2014, he was the MVP of the Southern League All-Star Game after going 3-for-3 with a home run. In 2015, Motter was named team MVP of the Durham Bulls after batting .292 and leading the International League in doubles (43) and extra-base hits (58). The Rays added Motter to their 40-man roster after the 2015 season.

Motter was called up to the major leagues on May 15, 2016. He recorded his first major-league hit the next day in his first at bat, off of J. A. Happ of the Toronto Blue Jays. The following game, he hit his first major-league home run, off of Toronto's Drew Storen. Motter made 33 appearances with the 2016 Rays, batting .188 with two home runs and nine RBIs.

Seattle Mariners
On November 18, 2016, Motter and Richie Shaffer were traded to the Seattle Mariners for Andrew Kittredge, Dalton Kelly, and Dylan Thompson. During 2017, Motter played in 92 games for the Mariners, batting .198 with seven home runs and 26 RBIs. He also played 25 games in Triple-A with the Tacoma Rainiers, where he had a .350 average. Early in the 2018 season, Motter split time between Tacoma (37 games, .197 average) and Seattle (seven games, .267 average).

Minnesota Twins
On May 28, 2018, Motter was claimed off waivers by the Minnesota Twins. He appeared in nine games with the Twins where he batted .053 (1-for-19); he also played for two Minnesota farm teams. He was designated for assignment on July 24, sent outright to Triple-A on July 27, and released on August 22.

2019–2020 seasons
On March 6, 2019, Motter signed a minor-league deal with the Detroit Tigers. He played in 10 games for the Double-A Erie SeaWolves, where he had a .148 average. He was released on May 14. On May 21, Motter signed with the New Britain Bees of the independent Atlantic League of Professional Baseball. In 34 games, he batted .282 with five home runs and 28 RBIs. On June 25, Motter's contract was purchased by the Oakland Athletics and he was assigned to the Double-A Midland RockHounds. With Midland, Motter played in 60 games while batting .213 with eight home runs and 26 RBIs. He became a free agent following the 2019 season. In November 2019, Motter was selected by the Sugar Land Skeeters of the Atlantic League in the dispersal draft of the New Britain Bees, as the Bees moved to the Futures Collegiate Baseball League and had held rights to Motter within the Atlantic League.

On December 12, 2019, Motter signed with the Kiwoom Heroes of the KBO League on a $350,000 contract. In 10 games with the Heroes during 2020, he batted .114 (4-for-35). Motter was placed on waivers by the team on May 29 after being sent down to their farm team earlier in the month. Motter also played five games and batted .444 (8-for-18) during 2020 with the Jersey Wise Guys of the All-American Baseball Challenge, a six-team recreational league formed in the New York metropolitan area during the COVID-19 pandemic.

Colorado Rockies
In March 2021, Motter signed a minor-league contract with the Colorado Rockies. After playing in 67 games for the Triple-A Albuquerque Isotopes, hitting .335 with 24 home runs and 57 RBIs, Motter's contract was selected by the Rockies on August 10, 2021. In 13 games for the Rockies, Motter struggled to a .150 average (3-for-20) without a home run or RBI. On August 30, 2021, Motter was designated for assignment by the Rockies.

Boston Red Sox
On September 2, 2021, Motter was claimed off of waivers by the Boston Red Sox. Two days later, Motter was added to Boston's active roster. After appearing in three games for Boston, he was designated for assignment, then sent outright to the Triple-A Worcester Red Sox. On October 5, Motter elected free agency.

Cincinnati Reds
On April 14, 2022, Motter signed with the Leones de Yucatán of the Mexican League. However, on April 22, he left the team after signing a minor league contract with the Cincinnati Reds organization. He returned to the Major Leagues when he joined the Reds on May 20. He appeared in two games, going 1-for-6 at the plate, and was returned back to Triple-A on May 24. He was released on July 21, 2022.

Atlanta Braves
On July 29, 2022, Motter signed a minor league deal with the Atlanta Braves.

St. Louis Cardinals
On November 18, 2022, Motter signed a minor league deal with the St. Louis Cardinals.

References

External links

1989 births
Living people
Sportspeople from West Palm Beach, Florida
Baseball players from Florida
Major League Baseball outfielders
Major League Baseball infielders
American expatriate baseball players in South Korea
Tampa Bay Rays players
Seattle Mariners players
Minnesota Twins players
Kiwoom Heroes players
Colorado Rockies players
Boston Red Sox players
Cincinnati Reds players
Coastal Carolina Chanticleers baseball players
Harwich Mariners players
Princeton Rays players
Bowling Green Hot Rods players
Gulf Coast Rays players
Charlotte Stone Crabs players
Montgomery Biscuits players
Bravos de Margarita players
American expatriate baseball players in Venezuela
Durham Bulls players
Yaquis de Obregón players
American expatriate baseball players in Mexico
Leones del Escogido players
American expatriate baseball players in the Dominican Republic
Tacoma Rainiers players
Rochester Red Wings players
Toros del Este players
Erie SeaWolves players
New Britain Bees players
Midland RockHounds players
Estrellas Orientales players
Albuquerque Isotopes players
Worcester Red Sox players